Dracula is a text adventure game by CRL released in 1986 for the Commodore 64, Amstrad CPC, and ZX Spectrum home computers. The game is based on the novel Dracula by Bram Stoker. It was the first video game to be rated by the BBFC. The game received a 15 certificate.

Plot 
An English lawyer travels to Carpathia to meet Count Dracula regarding a routine property transaction, but soon learns that his client has sinister ulterior intentions.

Gameplay 
The game is a standard text adventure with static graphics in some locations. It is divided into three parts:
"First Night" - The young solicitor arrives in Count Dracula's country, staying at the Golden Krone Hotel; strange events are observed
"The Arrival" - After an eventful journey, he arrives at Dracula's castle, and soon learns the real nature of his host's intentions; he realizes that he must escape if he is to survive...
"The Hunt" - A psychiatrist at an insane asylum in England receives a strange letter from a friend on business overseas, warning of "boxes of earth" and the "undead"; meanwhile a patient at the asylum grows increasingly disturbed...

Reception 
The game received a "15" certificate from the British Board of Film Censors because of the gory images it contains. However, CRL expressed disappointment with this as they had hoped for an "18" certificate.

Legacy 
CRL followed Dracula with three further adventures of a similar style, Frankenstein, Jack the Ripper and Wolfman, all of which also received BBFC ratings.

References

External links 
 
 Dracula at Lemon 64
 

1980s horror video games
1980s interactive fiction
1986 video games
Adventure games
Amstrad CPC games
Commodore 64 games
CRL Group games
Interactive fiction based on works
Single-player video games
Video games about vampires
Video games based on Dracula
Video games developed in the United Kingdom
Video games set in castles
ZX Spectrum games